Emes is a surname.

People with the surname include:

 Ian Emes (born 1949), British artist and film director
 John Emes (1762–1810), British engraver and painter
 Rebecca Emes (died 1830), English silversmith
 Thomas Emes (died 1707), English quack doctor and millenarian
 William Emes (–1803), English landscape gardener

See also 
 Eames